Innocent Eyes: Ten Year Anniversary Acoustic Edition is an acoustic compilation album by Australian recording artist Delta Goodrem, which was released on 29 November 2013 by Sony Music Australia. The album features fourteen tracks, all reworked, in celebration of the tenth anniversary since Goodrem released the original album, Innocent Eyes (2003), which has sold 1.2 million copies in Australia, over four million worldwide and spent twenty-nine weeks at number one on the ARIA Albums Chart. The album was recorded at Sydney's Studios 301 with Goodrem's band throughout 2013.

Background and release 

Goodrem recorded the album in the iconic Studios 301 in Sydney on a short trip back to Australia from her home in Los Angeles in late August. 
Goodrem first confirmed that she would be releasing the album in an interview she did with Instyle Magazine Australia where she confirmed she would repackaging Innocent Eyes as an acoustic version set for release in November. Sony Music Australia later announced that the album would be released on 29 November 2013 in Australia by digital download and physical purchase. The physical CD contains a second disc which features videos of the creation of the album. This also features on the iTunes Deluxe Edition. The album is being released to celebrate the ten year anniversary since the original Innocent Eyes album was released, which held the number one position in Australia for twenty-nine weeks and was certified platinum fifteen times.

Critical reception 

A day after the release of the album, RenownedForSound.com published a four-star review, which praised Goodrem by noting that "growth and maturity can be notably heard, especially through her vocals". They also stated, however, that there were some downfalls on the album, such as that "some of the songs suffer from the curse of oversinging." Some of these songs included some of her biggest hits: "Born to Try", "Not Me, Not I" and "Predictable". The article mentioned that the highlights on the album included "Lost Without You" and "Butterfly" as "these songs manage to find the right balance between the original and Delta’s vocal experimentation."

Commercial performance 
Innocent Eyes: Ten Year Anniversary Acoustic Edition made its debut at number twenty-two on the ARIA Albums Chart. The album also debuted at number seven on the ARIA Australian Artists Albums Chart, and at number eighteen on the ARIA Digital Albums Chart.

Track listing

Charts

Release history

References 

2013 compilation albums
Delta Goodrem albums
Sony Music Australia compilation albums